Carex pensylvanica is a species of flowering plant in the sedge family commonly called Pennsylvania sedge (sometimes shortened to Penn sedge). Other common names include early sedge, common oak sedge, and yellow sedge.

Distribution
This plant is native to North America, especially eastern Canada and the eastern United States. Based on a census of the literature, herbaria specimens, and confirmed sightings, C. pensylvanica is found in Manitoba, Ontario, and Quebec in Canada; and in the United States it is most widely distributed in Connecticut, Illinois, Massachusetts, Michigan, Minnesota, New Hampshire, New Jersey, Pennsylvania, mainland Rhode Island, Virginia and Wisconsin. it is also known from northern Alabama, the western Carolinas, the mostly eastern Dakotas, northern and southern Delaware, northern Georgia, western Iowa, mostly northern Indiana, northern and eastern Missouri, mostly central and eastern Ohio, and mostly central Tennessee. It is also found in Arkansas, Kentucky, Maine, Maryland and the District of Columbia, New York, West Virginia, and Vermont. It has been reported from just one county, Lee, in the far northeastern portion of the state of Mississippi.

Description

Pennsylvania sedge blooms early in the spring, from April to June. During the blooming period, the staminate spike produces slender cream-colored anthers, aging to light brown, and each pistillate floret produces three long white, thread-like styles. The scales underneath the florets are dark purple.

Ecology
This competitive species is often found in large monotypic stands. It is mainly vegetative, spreading via systems of cordlike rhizomes. Shorter rhizomes produce tufts, clumps, and mats, and longer rhizomes form wide, matted colonies.

References

External links
 
 

pensylvanica
Plants described in 1792
Flora of Western Canada
Flora of Eastern Canada
Flora of the North-Central United States
Flora of the Southeastern United States